The 2006 Men's Arab Volleyball Championship was held in Manama, Bahrain, from November 16 to November 23, 2006.

Teams

 (B Team)

Pools composition

Pool A

|}

|}

Pool B

|}

|}

Final round

Classification 5–10 places

Ninth place match

|}

Seventh place match

|}

Fifth place match

|}

Championship bracket

Semifinals

|}

Bronze medal match

|}

Final

|}

Final standing

Team Roster
Bilel Ben Hassine, Anouer Taouerghi, Mohamed Ben Slimane, Marouane M'rabet, Salem Mejri, Tarek Sammari, Marouen Fehri, Seifeddine Hmem, Marouen Garci, Mahdi Gara ...
Head Coach: Hichem Ben Romdhane

Awards
MVP:  Tarek Sammari
Best Spiker:  Sadek Ibrahim
Best Blocker:  Seifeddine Hmem
Best Server:  Hicham Guemmadi
Best Setter:  Khalil Al Bahrani
Best Receiver:  Ahmed Al Bakhet
Best Libero:  Aymen Harouna

References

External links
 kooora.com 
 Official AVA website

Men's Arab Volleyball Championship
Men's Arab Volleyball Championship
Arab Volleyball Championship
International volleyball competitions hosted by Bahrain